Glenloch is an unincorporated community in East Whiteland and West Whiteland Township, Chester County, Pennsylvania, United States, located between Exton and Frazer. It is served by U.S. Route 30, U.S. Route 202, and Lincoln Highway (U.S. Route 30 Business.) These three roads interchange at a spaghetti junction. Phoenixville Pike and Valley Center Boulevard are other important roads in Glenloch and both end on Lincoln Highway. The community is split between the post offices of West Chester, Exton, and Malvern with the ZIP codes of 19380, 19341, and 19355, respectively.

References

Unincorporated communities in Chester County, Pennsylvania
Unincorporated communities in Pennsylvania